Paire may refer to:

People
Benoît Paire (born 1989), French tennis player, younger brother of Thomas
Pepper Paire (1924 – 2013), baseball catcher and infielder
Thomas Paire (born 1985), French tennis player, older brother of Benoît

Places
Hall du Paire, multi-purpose arena in Pepinster, Belgium

Sports
Paire FC, football club from Saipan in the Northern Mariana Islands